JSON (JavaScript Object Notation, pronounced ; also ) is an open standard file format and data interchange format that uses human-readable text to store and transmit data objects consisting of attribute–value pairs and arrays (or other serializable values). It is a common data format with diverse  uses in electronic data interchange, including that of web applications with servers.

JSON is a language-independent data format. It was derived from JavaScript, but many modern programming languages include code to generate and parse JSON-format data. JSON filenames use the extension .json.

Douglas Crockford originally specified the JSON format in the early 2000s. He and Chip Morningstar sent the first JSON message in April 2001.

Naming and pronunciation 
The 2017 international standard (ECMA-404 and ISO/IEC 21778:2017) specifies "Pronounced , as in 'Jason and The Argonauts. The first (2013) edition of ECMA-404 did not address the pronunciation. The UNIX and Linux System Administration Handbook states that "Douglas Crockford, who named and promoted the JSON format, says it's pronounced like the name Jason. But somehow, 'JAY-sawn' seems to have become more common in the technical community." Crockford said in 2011, "There's a lot of argument about how you pronounce that, but I strictly don't care."

Standards 
After  had been available as its "informational" specification since 2006, JSON was first standardized in 2013, as ECMA-404. , published in 2017, is the current version of the Internet Standard STD 90, and it remains consistent with ECMA-404. That same year, JSON was also standardized as ISO/IEC 21778:2017. The ECMA and ISO/IEC standards describe only the allowed syntax, whereas the RFC covers some security and interoperability considerations.

History

JSON grew out of a need for a stateless, real-time server-to-browser communication protocol without using browser plugins such as Flash or Java applets, the dominant methods used in the early 2000s.

Crockford first specified and popularized the JSON format. The acronym originated at State Software, a company co-founded by Crockford and others in March 2001. The co-founders agreed to build a system that used standard browser capabilities and provided an abstraction layer for Web developers to create stateful Web applications that had a persistent duplex connection to a Web server by holding two Hypertext Transfer Protocol (HTTP) connections open and recycling them before standard browser time-outs if no further data were exchanged. The co-founders had a round-table discussion and voted whether to call the data format JSML (JavaScript Markup Language) or JSON (JavaScript Object Notation), as well as under what license type to make it available. The JSON.org website was launched in 2002. In December 2005, Yahoo! began offering some of its Web services in JSON.

A precursor to the JSON libraries was used in a children's digital asset trading game project named Cartoon Orbit at Communities.com  (the State co-founders had all worked at this company previously) for Cartoon Network , which used a browser side plug-in with a proprietary messaging format to manipulate DHTML elements (this system is also owned by 3DO ). Upon discovery of early Ajax capabilities, digiGroups, Noosh, and others used frames to pass information into the user browsers' visual field without refreshing a Web application's visual context, realizing real-time rich Web applications using only the standard HTTP, HTML and JavaScript capabilities of Netscape 4.0.5+ and IE 5+. Crockford then found that JavaScript could be used as an object-based messaging format for such a system. The system was sold to Sun Microsystems, Amazon.com and EDS.

JSON was based on a subset of the JavaScript scripting language (specifically, Standard ECMA-262 3rd Edition—December 1999) and is commonly used with JavaScript, but it is a language-independent data format. Code for parsing and generating JSON data is readily available in many programming languages. JSON's website lists JSON libraries by language.

In October 2013, Ecma International published the first edition of its JSON standard ECMA-404. That same year,  used ECMA-404 as a reference. In November 2017, ISO/IEC JTC 1/SC 22 published ISO/IEC 21778:2017 as an international standard. On 13 December 2017, the Internet Engineering Task Force obsoleted  when it published , which is the current version of the Internet Standard STD 90.

Crockford added a clause to the JSON license stating that "The Software shall be used for Good, not Evil," in order to open-source the JSON libraries while mocking corporate lawyers and those who are overly pedantic. On the other hand, this clause led to license compatibility problems of the JSON license with other open-source licenses, as open-source software and free software usually imply no restrictions on the purpose of use.

Syntax 
The following example shows a possible JSON representation describing a person.

{
  "firstName": "John",
  "lastName": "Smith",
  "isAlive": true,
  "age": 27,
  "address": {
    "streetAddress": "21 2nd Street",
    "city": "New York",
    "state": "NY",
    "postalCode": "10021-3100"
  },
  "phoneNumbers": [
    {
      "type": "home",
      "number": "212 555-1234"
    },
    {
      "type": "office",
      "number": "646 555-4567"
    }
  ],
  "children": [
      "Catherine",
      "Thomas",
      "Trevor"
  ],
  "spouse": null
}

Character encoding 
This is a consequence of JSON disallowing only "control characters". For maximum portability, these characters should be backslash-escaped.

JSON exchange in an open ecosystem must be encoded in UTF-8. The encoding supports the full Unicode character set, including those characters outside the Basic Multilingual Plane (U+10000 to U+10FFFF). However, if escaped, those characters must be written using UTF-16 surrogate pairs. For example, to include the Emoji character  in JSON:

{ "face": "😐" }
// or
{ "face": "\uD83D\uDE10" }

JSON became a strict subset of ECMAScript as of the language's 2019 revision.

Data types 
JSON's basic data types are:

 Number: a signed decimal number that may contain a fractional part and may use exponential E notation, but cannot include non-numbers such as NaN. The format makes no distinction between integer and floating-point. JavaScript uses IEEE-754 double-precision floating-point format for all its numeric values (later also supporting BigInt), but other languages implementing JSON may encode numbers differently.
 String: a sequence of zero or more Unicode characters. Strings are delimited with double quotation marks and support a backslash escaping syntax.
 Boolean: either of the values true or false
 Array: an ordered list of zero or more elements, each of which may be of any type. Arrays use square bracket notation with comma-separated elements.
 Object: a collection of name–value pairs where the names (also called keys) are strings. The current ECMA standard states: "The JSON syntax does not impose any restrictions on the strings used as names, does not require that name strings be unique, and does not assign any significance to the ordering of name/value pairs."  Objects are delimited with curly brackets and use commas to separate each pair, while within each pair the colon ':' character separates the key or name from its value.
 null: an empty value, using the word null

Whitespace is allowed and ignored around or between syntactic elements (values and punctuation, but not within a string value). Four specific characters are considered whitespace for this purpose: space, horizontal tab, line feed, and carriage return. In particular, the byte order mark must not be generated by a conforming implementation (though it may be accepted when parsing JSON). JSON does not provide syntax for comments.

Early versions of JSON (such as specified by ) required that a valid JSON text must consist of only an object or an array type, which could contain other types within them.

Numbers in JSON are agnostic with regard to their representation within programming languages. While this allows for numbers of arbitrary precision to be serialized, it may lead to portability issues. For example, since no differentiation is made between integer and floating-point values, some implementations may treat 42, 42.0, and 4.2E+1 as the same number, while others may not. The JSON standard makes no requirements regarding implementation details such as overflow, underflow, loss of precision, rounding, or signed zeros, but it does recommend expecting no more than IEEE 754 binary64 precision for "good interoperability". There is no inherent precision loss in serializing a machine-level binary representation of a floating-point number (like binary64) into a human-readable decimal representation (like numbers in JSON), and back, since there exist published algorithms to do this exactly and optimally.

Comments were intentionally excluded from JSON. In 2012, Douglas Crockford described his design decision thus: "I removed comments from JSON because I saw people were using them to hold parsing directives, a practice which would have destroyed interoperability."

JSON disallows "trailing commas", a comma after the last value inside a data structure. Trailing commas are a common feature of JSON derivatives to improve ease of use.

Semantics 
While JSON provides a syntactic framework for data interchange, unambiguous data interchange also requires agreement between producer and consumer on the semantics of specific use of the JSON syntax. One example of where such an agreement is necessary is the serialization of data types defined by the JavaScript syntax that are not part of the JSON standard, e.g., Date, Function, Regular Expression, and undefined.

Interoperability 

RFC 8259 describes certain aspects of JSON syntax which, while legal per the specifications, can cause interoperability problems.

 Certain JSON implementations only accept JSON texts which represent an object or an array. For interoperability, applications interchanging JSON should transmit messages which are objects or arrays.
 The specifications allow JSON objects which contain multiple members with the same name. The behavior of implementations processing objects with duplicate names is unpredictable. For interoperability, applications should avoid duplicate names when transmitting JSON objects.
 The specifications specifically say that the order of members in JSON objects is not significant. For interoperability, applications should avoid assigning meaning to member ordering even if the parsing software makes that ordering visible.
 While the specifications place no limits on the magnitude or precisions of JSON number literals, the widely-used JavaScript implementation stores them as IEEE754 "binary64" quantities. For interoperability, applications should avoid transmitting numbers which cannot be represented in this way, for example 1E400 or 3.141592653589793238462643383279.
 While the specifications do not constrain the character encoding of the Unicode characters in a JSON text, the vast majority of implementations assume UTF-8 encoding; for interoperability, applications should always and only encode JSON messages in UTF-8.
 The specifications do not forbid transmitting byte sequences that do not correctly represent Unicode characters. For interoperability, applications should transmit messages containing no such byte sequences.
 The specification does not constrain how applications go about comparing Unicode strings. For interoperability, applications should always perform such comparisons code unit by code unit.

In 2015, the IETF published RFC7493, describing the "I-JSON Message Format", a restricted profile of JSON which constrains the syntax and processing of JSON to avoid, as much as possible, these interoperability issues.

Metadata and schema 
The official MIME type for JSON text is "application/json", and most modern implementations have adopted this. The unofficial MIME type "text/json" or the content-type "text/javascript" are also supported for legacy reasons by many service providers, browsers, servers, web applications, libraries, frameworks, and APIs. Notable examples include the Google Search API, Yahoo!, Flickr, Facebook API, Lift framework, and Dojo Toolkit 0.4.

JSON Schema specifies a JSON-based format to define the structure of JSON data for validation, documentation, and interaction control. It provides a contract for the JSON data required by a given application, and how that data can be modified. JSON Schema is based on the concepts from XML Schema (XSD) but is JSON-based. As in XSD, the same serialization/deserialization tools can be used both for the schema and data, and it is self-describing. It is specified in an Internet Draft at the IETF, currently in 2020-12 draft, which was released on January 28, 2021. There are several validators available for different programming languages, each with varying levels of conformance. The standard filename extension is .json.

The JSON standard does not support object references, but an IETF draft standard for JSON-based object references exists.

Uses 

JSON-RPC is a remote procedure call (RPC) protocol built on JSON, as a replacement for XML-RPC or SOAP. It is a simple protocol that defines only a handful of data types and commands. JSON-RPC lets a system send notifications (information to the server that does not require a response) and multiple calls to the server that can be answered out of order.

Asynchronous JavaScript and JSON (or AJAJ) refers to the same dynamic web page methodology as Ajax, but instead of XML, JSON is the data format. AJAJ is a web development technique that provides for the ability of a webpage to request new data after it has loaded into the web browser. Typically it renders new data from the server in response to user actions on that webpage. For example, what the user types into a search box, client-side code then sends to the server, which immediately responds with a drop-down list of matching database items.

JSON has seen ad hoc usage as a configuration language. However, it does not support comments.
In 2012, Douglas Crockford, JSON creator, had this to say about comments in JSON when used as a configuration language: "I know that the lack of comments makes some people sad, but it shouldn't. Suppose you are using JSON to keep configuration files, which you would like to annotate. Go ahead and insert all the comments you like. Then pipe it through JSMin before handing it to your JSON parser."

MongoDB uses JSON-like data for its document-oriented database.

Some relational databases, such as PostgreSQL and MySQL, have added support for native JSON data types. This allows developers to store JSON data directly in a relational database without having to convert it to another data format.

Safety
JSON being a subset of JavaScript can lead to the misconception that it is safe to pass JSON texts to the JavaScript  function. To avoid the many pitfalls caused by executing arbitrary code from the Internet, a new function,  was first added to the fifth edition of ECMAScript, which as of 2017 is supported by all major browsers. For non-supported browsers, an API-compatible JavaScript library is provided by Douglas Crockford. In addition, the TC39 proposal "Subsume JSON" made ECMAScript a strict JSON superset as of the language's 2019 revision.
Various JSON parser implementations have suffered from denial-of-service attack and mass assignment vulnerability.

Alternatives 

JSON is promoted as a low-overhead alternative to XML as both of these formats have widespread support for creation, reading, and decoding in the real-world situations where they are commonly used. Apart from XML, examples could include CSV and supersets of JSON). Also, Google Protocol Buffers can fill this role, although it is not a data interchange language.

XML 
XML has been used to describe structured data and to serialize objects. Various XML-based protocols exist to represent the same kind of data structures as JSON for the same kind of data interchange purposes. Data can be encoded in XML in several ways. However, an XML attribute can only have a single value and each attribute can appear at most once on each element.

XML separates "data" from "metadata" (via the use of elements and attributes), while JSON does not have such a concept.

Another key difference is the addressing of values. JSON has objects with a simple "key" to "value" mapping, whereas in XML addressing happens on "nodes", which all receive a unique ID via the XML processor. Additionally, the XML standard defines a common attribute , that can be used by the user, to set an ID explicitly.

XML values are strings of characters, with no built-in type safety. XML has the concept of schema, that permits strong typing, user-defined types, predefined tags, and formal structure, allowing for formal validation of an XML stream. JSON has several types built-in and has a similar schema concept in JSON Schema.

XML supports comments, while JSON does not.

Supersets

Support for comments and other features have been deemed useful, which has led to several nonstandard JSON supersets being created. Among them are HJSON, HOCON, and JSON5 (which despite its name, is not the fifth version of JSON).

YAML 

YAML version 1.2 is a superset of JSON; prior versions were not strictly compatible. For example, escaping a slash  with a backslash  is valid in JSON, but was not valid in YAML. YAML supports comments, while JSON does not.

CSON 
CSON ("cursive script object notation"), is defined as tiny grammar additions to JSONs ABNF grammar specified by RFC 4627. Like YAML, it is a strict superset of JSON. Contrary to YAML, every CSON data can be translated to JSON back and forth, so one can continue to use a library which only understands JSON, and one does not have to translate existing JSON. Besides such JSON equivalence, design considerations were:
 Ease of writing, it supports comments, single + double quoted strings, strings in multiple lines, redundant commas.
 Ease of parsing, it is LL(1) and explicitly avoids context sensitivity.
 Incompatibility to JavaScript is not strict, therefor avoid CSON over HTTP.
 Whitespaces are not significant.
 Like YAML, strict string, no data types, unlike e.g., TOML. Additional data types should not be a data format job, and would make every implementation difficult.
Libraries for C, JavaScript, python, and rust exist.

HOCON 
HOCON ("Human-Optimized Config Object Notation" is a format for human-readable data, and a superset of JSON.
The uses of HOCON are:
 It is primarily used in conjunction with the Play framework, and is developed by Lightbend. 
 It is also supported as a configuration format for .NET projects via Akka.NET and Puppet.
 TIBCO Streaming: HOCON is the primary configuration file format for the TIBCO Streaming family of products (StreamBase, LiveView, and Artifact Management Server) as of TIBCO Streaming Release 10.
 It is also the primary configuration file format for several subsystems of Exabeam Advanced Analytics.
 Jitsi uses it as the "new" config system and .properties-Files as fallback

Derivatives 
Several serialization formats have been built on or from the JSON specification. Examples include 

 GeoJSON, a format designed for representing simple geographical features
 JSON→URL, a language-independent data interchange format for the JSON data model
 JSON-LD, a method of encoding linked data using JSON
 JSON-RPC, a remote procedure call protocol encoded in JSON
 JsonML, a lightweight markup language used to map between XML and JSON
 Smile (data interchange format)
 UBJSON, a binary computer data interchange format imitating JSON, but requiring fewer bytes of data

See also 
 BSON
 Comparison of data serialization formats
 Amazon Ion a superset of JSON
 Jackson (API)
 jaql - a functional data processing and query language most commonly used for JSON query processing
 jq - a "JSON query language" and high-level programming language
 JSONiq - a JSON-oriented query and processing language based on XQuery
 JSON streaming
 S-expression
 Wikipedia TNT Module

References

External links 

 

 
Ajax (programming)
Articles with example JavaScript code
Computer-related introductions in 2001
Ecma standards
ISO standards
Markup languages
Open formats